In algebra, the fixed-point subgroup  of an automorphism f of a group G is the subgroup of G:

More generally, if S is a set of automorphisms of G (i.e., a subset of the automorphism group of G), then the set of the elements of G that are left fixed by every automorphism in S is a subgroup of G, denoted by GS.

Then  is the group  of n-by-n orthogonal matrices.

To give an abstract example, let S be a subset of a group G. Then each element s of S can be associated with the automorphism , i.e. conjugation by s. Then
;
that is, the centralizer of S.

References

Algebraic groups